Daniel Gauthier (born May 17, 1970) is a Canadian former ice hockey centre.

Gauthier was drafted 62nd overall by the Pittsburgh Penguins in the 1988 NHL Entry Draft. He turned pro in 1990 in the International Hockey League with the Albany Choppers for one game before joining the ECHL's Knoxville Cherokees, scoring 41 goals and 93 assists for 134 points. In his rookie season Gauthier was named to the 1990–91 ECHL First All-Star Team and also won the John A. Daley Trophy as the ECHL's Rookie of the Year.

He then had spells in the IHL for the Muskegon Lumberjacks and later the Cleveland Lumberjacks following their relocation. In 1993, Gauthier signed with the Florida Panthers as a free agent, but was assigned to the IHL's Cincinnati Cyclones and never played for the Panthers. A year later he became a free agent once more and signed with the Chicago Blackhawks. He was initially assigned to the IHL's Indianapolis Ice, but eventually played 5 NHL games during the 1994-95 NHL season but scored no points.

After splitting the 1995-96 with the Ice and the Peoria Rivermen, Gauthier moved to Europe. Brief spells in the Deutsche Eishockey Liga with the Frankfurt Lions and the Wedemark Scorpions were followed by a move to the Austrian Hockey League with the VEU Feldkirch. After three seasons, Gauthier moved to the Swiss Nationalliga A and joined SCL Tigers for another three years. He then rejoined Feldkirch in another three season spell before moving to Italy's Serie A, joining HC Asiago. He returned to Austria and signed for EC VSV. In 2008, Gauthier returned to North America and played in the Ligue Nord-Américaine de Hockey (LNAH) with spells for the Saint-Hyacinthe Top Design and the Saguenay 98.3 before returning to Feldkirch once more.

In September 2022, Gauthier was named as the head coach of the Bâtisseurs de Montcalm of the LNAH, an expansion team in their first season, after having previously coached at the junior hockey level.

Family
His son, Danick Gauthier (born October 24, 1991) is a professional hockey player with the Syracuse Crunch of the American Hockey League.

References

External links

1970 births
Living people
Albany Choppers players
Asiago Hockey 1935 players
Canadian ice hockey centres
Chicago Blackhawks players
Cincinnati Cyclones (IHL) players
Cleveland Lumberjacks players
Dornbirn Bulldogs players
Frankfurt Lions players
Indianapolis Ice players
Knoxville Cherokees players
Ligue Nord-Américaine de Hockey players
Longueuil Chevaliers players
Muskegon Lumberjacks players
Peoria Rivermen (IHL) players
Pittsburgh Penguins draft picks
SCL Tigers players
Ice hockey people from Montreal
VEU Feldkirch players
Victoriaville Tigres players
EC VSV players
Wedemark Scorpions players
Montreal Roadrunners players
Ottawa Loggers players
Canadian expatriate ice hockey players in Austria
Canadian expatriate ice hockey players in Italy
Canadian expatriate ice hockey players in Germany
Canadian expatriate ice hockey players in Switzerland